International Logging Inc. was an oilfield mudlogging services company.

Background
The company provided the world's oil & gas industry with products and services for Mudlogging, Well Wizard, Drill Logic System, Well Wizard Integrated Data System, Drilling Optimization Consultant, Wellhub, Gas Chromatograph, GC Tracer, Early Detection H2S, Consulting Services, Kick Detection, Hole Stability and Vibration Detection Services. Inter-Log operated worldwide mainly based in countries with a mature petroleum industry as is the case with most oil & gas service companies.

The company headquarters was in Houston, Texas, and the company had  major offices around the world.

Weatherford Purchase
Weatherford International bought International Logging Inc. at August 18, 2008.

See also
 List of oilfield service companies

References

External links
 Rigzone News Archive - International Logging Inc

Oilfield services companies
Manufacturing companies based in Houston